Allan Ekelund (16 January 1918 – 4 September 2009) was a Swedish film producer. He produced 50 films between 1947 and 1964.

Selected filmography

 The Emperor of Portugallia (1944)
 Father Bom (1949)
 To Joy (1950)
 The Kiss on the Cruise (1950)
 Summer Interlude (1951)
 Skipper in Stormy Weather (1951)
 Defiance (1952)
 Blondie, Beef and the Banana (1952)
 Secrets of Women (1952)
 Love (1952)
 Say It with Flowers (1952)
 Summer with Monika (1953)
 Dance, My Doll (1953)
 Hidden in the Fog (1953)
 No Man's Woman (1953)
 The Glass Mountain (1953)
 A Lesson in Love (1954)
 Smiles of a Summer Night (1955)
 Violence (1955)
 The Light from Lund (1955)
 The Biscuit (1956)
 The Hard Game (1956)
Seventh Heaven (1956)
 The Song of the Scarlet Flower (1956)
 The Seventh Seal (1957)
 Night Light (1957)
 The Halo Is Slipping (1957)
 Encounters in the Twilight (1957)
 Wild Strawberries (1957)
 The Jazz Boy (1958)
 The Magician (1958)
 More Than a Match for the Navy (1958)
 Crime in Paradise (1959)
 Heaven and Pancake (1959)
 The Virgin Spring (1960)
 On a Bench in a Park (1960)
 Through a Glass Darkly (1961)
 Winter Light (1962)
 Siska (1962)
 The Mistress (1962)
 The Silence (1963)
 All These Women (1964)

References

External links

1918 births
2009 deaths
Swedish film producers
People from Örebro
Producers who won the Best Film Guldbagge Award